Creative Construction Company (also referred to as CCC) is a 1975 album by the jazz collective Creative Construction Company, originally released on the Muse label, and later reissued as Muhal on the Italian Vedette label.

Reception

Allmusic awarded the album 3 stars.

Track listing
All compositions by Leroy Jenkins
 "Muhal (Part I)" - 19:24
 "Muhal (Part II)" - 14:40
 "Live Spiral" - 2:40

Personnel 
Anthony Braxton - alto saxophone, soprano saxophone, clarinet, flute, contrabass clarinet, chimes
Leroy Jenkins - violin, viola, recorder, toy xylophone, harmonica, bicycle horn
Leo Smith - trumpet, flugelhorn, French horn, seal horn, percussion
Muhal Richard Abrams - piano, cello, clarinet
Richard Davis - bass
Steve McCall - drums, percussion

References 

Creative Construction Company albums
Muse Records live albums
1975 live albums